Telford is a town in Shropshire, England. It is in the Telford and Wrekin borough and which is both a unitary authority and covers the wider towns, villages and suburbs of the town. The town is inland and near the River Severn.

The notable hill near the town called The Wrekin is part of the Shropshire Hills an Area of Outstanding Natural Beauty. To the south of the town, is the Ironbridge Gorge, a UNESCO World Heritage Site. Places around the Ironbridge Gorge area, which were developed into the town itself, are internationally recognised as being "The Birthplace of Industry" being to a large extent constructed during the Industrial Revolution on the Shropshire Coalfield.

In the 2011 census, the town had a population of 142,723 while in the 2017 estimate wider borough had a population of 175,271.

The town is polycentric, having been designated in 1963 and 1968 under the new towns act and developed between the 1960s to the 1970s. Centred on a shopping centre and a public park, the new town is named after Thomas Telford; a civil engineer to many road, canal and rail projects in the county. It was originally designated under the name Dawley New Town, Dawley being to the south of new-town’s centre. As well as multiple villages and Dawley, the other constituent towns are Wellington, Madeley, Shropshire and Oakengates.

History

Early history

Early settlement in the area was thought to be on the land that sloped up from the Weald Moors (an area north of the town centre) towards the line along which the Roman Watling Street was built. Farmland surrounded three large estates in the 10th century, namely Wellington, Wrockwardine and Lilleshall.

From the 13th century there was urban development in Wellington and Madeley, where Wenlock Priory founded a new town. Six monastic houses, founded in the 11th and 12th centuries, had large interests in the area's economic growth. They collectively acquired almost half of the area and profited from coal and ironstone mines and iron smithies on their estates.

The area was the site of the 1821 Cinderloo Uprising, which saw 3,000 people protest against the lowering of wages for those working in the local coal industry. The protests resulted in the deaths of three striking colliers.

Modern history

The New Town was first designated on 16 January 1963 by the Conservative administration as Dawley New Town, covering  of Dawley, Wenlock, Oakengates, Wellington Rural District and Shifnal Rural District. Development started, guided by the Dawley New Town Development Corporation, with the first homes on the new Sutton Hill housing estate being occupied in 1967. Initial planning and design concepts for Dawley New Town were produced by the Birmingham-based John Madin Design Group.

The Order also renamed the new town Telford, after the Scottish-born civil engineer Thomas Telford, who in 1787 became Surveyor of Public Works for Shropshire. Other suggested names at the time were Dawelloak and Wrekin Forest City.

Most of the infrastructure was constructed from the late 1960s and throughout the 1970s, with the major housing and commercial development occurring over three decades up to the early 1990s when the Development Corporation was wound up to be replaced by the Commission for New Towns, later English Partnerships, and most of the property was handed over to the then Wrekin District Council. Telford was now 25 years old and was firmly established as one of the most important towns in the region.

In 1983, after fierce opposition and three public enquiries, the M54 motorway was completed, connecting the town to the M6 and thence the rest of the UK's motorway network. Other major roads are the A5, A518 and A442, which is commonly known as the Eastern Primary or EP, and is officially branded Queensway.

Many of the new town's residents were originally from the West Midlands conurbation, which includes Wolverhampton, Birmingham, Dudley and Walsall. A majority of the council house tenants in Telford were rehoused from inner-city Birmingham. The rehousing affected existing communities, who were sometimes resentful of the changes. As a result some individuals still refuse to put Telford in their address, instead using the original local name (such as Wellington or Dawley) and often citing the existence of town Councils as support for the argument "you can't live in a town in a town”, e.g. Wellington (Town) Telford (Town). The new town's residents who arrived in the 1960s and 1970s earned the unwanted nickname ‘overspill’ from people living in the existing towns and villages.

In 2007 a £250 million regeneration plan for the town centre was announced, which includes the pedestrianisation of the road surrounding the shopping centre and the creation of new cafés, bars and shops which would lead to 1,750 new jobs. The reason for the expansion is that the original ‘centre’ was only ever a shopping place with no real heart. As the ‘centre’ closed early in the evening there was no nightlife at all in the area, the only major local entertainment areas being in Oakengates and Wellington.

The first phase of the town-centre development, named Southwater, was completed in 2014. The official opening ceremony, on 18 October 2014, included live music and fireworks. The area includes a refurbished library, various chain restaurants, Cineworld IMAX Cinema, bowling alley/arcade and a new multi-storey car park.

Geography

The town covers 7,803 hectares (30.13 square miles) and its southern and eastern parts, between the Severn Gorge and Donnington Wood, include the East Shropshire coalfield. North and north-west Telford lie beyond the coalfield's boundary fault on sandstone beds which, along with other Triassic formations, prevail over much of the North Shropshire plain. The town centre stands on a watershed, with land to the south draining towards the River Severn and to the north sloping gently down towards the Weald Moors. The town is dominated by the Wrekin, a large hill of 407 m (1335 ft), south-west of Wellington, straddling the border with the unitary Shropshire Council (before the latter's creation in 2009 the borough of Shrewsbury and Atcham).

Governance

Within the borough of Telford & Wrekin, the town is entirely parished. Telford has no single town council because of this. The town is also divided into Wards, within the Telford and Wrekin borough. These are used for electoral purposes and demographic surveys. Telford was created politically – but its attempts to make a cohesive town from the fusion of other independent towns: Wellington, Madeley, Hadley, Oakengates, Dawley, Ironbridge and Donnington have largely been successful. Despite this, the town has much clearer divisions than in other older towns, such as nearby Shrewsbury, which have developed into one consolidated urban area over time. Some small settlements to the south such as a part of Ironbridge and Broseley, while part of the Telford Urban Area, are administered by Shropshire Council.

Telford is the only settlement within the Telford parliamentary constituency, which was held by Labour from its creation in 1997 until the 2015 general election. The current MP is Lucy Allan (Conservative). Some suburbs, such as Wellington, are located in The Wrekin, which also has varying support between the Conservatives and Labour. Conservative Mark Pritchard was reelected as the latter seat's MP in 2019, and has now held the seat continuously since 2005. Telford is administratively part of the West Midlands region.

Demography

In 1963 Dawley new town was intended to take 50,000 people from the West Midlands conurbation and so to grow to a town of 70,000 or more. By 1968 Telford was intended to take an additional 50,000 and grow to a town of 220,000 or more by 1991. By 1983, however, Telford's population was just under 108,000, and it was generally thought that it might not reach 120,000 by the late 1980s.

The population of Telford's built-up area was 147,980 according to the 2011 census. At the 2001 census, the urban area had 138,241 people. The built-up area includes Broseley which lies outside the Borough of Telford and Wrekin and also includes the towns of Dawley, Oakengates, Wellington and Madeley.

Telford has a younger than average population, and a higher rate of teenage pregnancy than the national average, as well as relatively high levels of income deprivation with 15% of residents living in low income households. In addition the level of statutorily homeless households in 2004/05 was above average for England. The Telford and Wrekin area is a popular commuter zone, containing some relatively rural areas in the North and West of the borough. These are popular with commuters to the West Midlands conurbation, due to the good transport links provided by the A5/M54.

In 2011, the town was 91.9% white (88.5% White British), 4.7% Asian, 1.2% Black, 1.9% Mixed race and 0.2% other. At the same census the population of the town was 142,723 and had an area of 46.2 kilometers with the population estimated to be 147,105 in 2016.

Economy

During the economic crisis of the late 1960s (with unemployment doubling nationally during the second half of the decade), unemployment in the then-new town was initially high.

However, in 1967 Halesfield Industrial Estate was founded on the south-eastern edge of the town – the first real answer to Telford's unemployment problems. Other large estates followed, in 1973 with Stafford Park just east of the town centre and in 1979 with Hortonwood, to the north, helping ease the unemployment crisis in a decade which saw an almost unbroken rise in unemployment.

In total, half a million square metres of factory space were provided between 1968 and 1983, making Telford an attractive investment area.

By 1976, Telford had begun to recruit industry from the US, Europe, and Japan. The foreign firms required larger factories, and they began to be built at Stafford Park. By 1983 over 2,000 jobs in Telford were provided by around 40 (mostly American) foreign companies. In contrast to industry in the Black Country at the time, these new companies focused on high-technology industries rather than the heavy and metal-finishing industries.

The new arrivals included the American company Unimation and three firms from Japan: Nikon UK Ltd., which opened a warehouse at Halesfield in 1983; video-tape manufacturers Hitachi Maxell at Apley Castle in 1983; and office equipment manufacturers Ricoh, who took a  site for a factory at Priorslee next to the M54, and formed the first in Telford's new enterprise zone.

Consequently, from the later 1970s, Telford began to attract high-technology firms and to diversify its industry, and the promotion of the Service industry also began to prosper, in the Telford Town Centre area. However, a deepening national recession meant that, despite the creation of new jobs, there were net job losses from 1979. Unemployment grew from 3.4 per cent in 1969 to over 8 per cent in 1972 and 22.3 per cent (almost double the national average) in 1983; long-term unemployment rose even faster. Nevertheless, the rate of increase in unemployment was slowing down by 1983 and was making some progress against national and regional trends.

Unemployment in Telford was still around the 20% mark – nearly double the national average at the time – as late as 1986. The Lawson Boom of the next three years saw that figure fall dramatically by the end of the decade, only for it to rise to a similarly high figure again by 1992 as a result of the early 1990s recession. In recent years the local economy has matured, the median gross weekly earnings for full-time workers who work in Telford and Wrekin was £563 in 2019 (West Midlands £552.50 and England £591.40).

Telford has attracted several large IT services companies, including EDS who support the MOD contract from the Euston Park site, as well as a vast array of clients across the world from the Plaza building. Also Capgemini and Fujitsu employ a significant number of staff in the area, mainly supporting their governmental client, Her Majesty's Revenue and Customs (HMRC). The expansion in these job sectors provided a great asset to Telford's economic recovery after 1992. By August 2007, the success story of Telford's economy had seen unemployment shrink to 3.3% – a fraction of its peak 15 years earlier.

However, the subsequent recession meant that unemployment in the area had risen to 5% by February 2011, although this was still well below the national average.

The Shropshire Star evening newspaper is based at Ketley. There is a free local paper the Telford Journal which is also published by the Shropshire star.

There have been job losses, with the movement of 500 Defence Logistics Organisation (DLO) jobs at the MoD base at Sapphire House, Telford town centre, to Bristol. The sugar beet factory at Allscott closed in 2007.

In 2019 a joint venture called Rheinmetall BAE Systems Land installed itself in Telford, not far from Babcock DSG. Together they are responsible for the Challenger 2 Life Extension Project.

Suburbs

Southside
Aqueduct, Brookside, Dawley Bank, Doseley, Hollinswood, Heath Hill, Horsehay, Lawley, Lawley Bank, Lightmoor, Little Dawley, Malinslee, Newdale, Old Park, Overdale, Randlay, Stirchley, Sutton Hill, The Rock, Tweedale, Woodside.

Northside
Arleston, Donnington, Donnington Wood, Hadley, Hartshill, Haybridge, Ketley, Ketley Bank, Ketleybrook, Ketleyhill, Leegomery, Muxton, Priorslee, Priorslee Village, Red Lake, Snedshill, St Georges, Trench, Trench Lock, Wombridge, Wrockwardine Wood.

Surrounding Subtowns & Villages
Blists Hill, Coalbrookdale, Coalport, Dawley, Ironbridge, Jackfield, Madeley, Newport, Oakengates, Wellington (including Admaston, Bratton, Donnerville, Dothill, Haygate, Shawbirch).

Industrial Areas
Hadley Castle, Halesfield, Hortonwood, Stafford Park

Landmarks

The commercial centre of the town is Telford Town Centre, located off Junction 5 of the M54 motorway, completed in the 1980s. It is home to the administrative headquarters of Telford & Wrekin Council, which are now based at Addenbrook House on Ironmasters Way, after moving from the old Civic Offices (dating from the mid-1970s) in December 2012. The large Telford Shopping Centre (and the accompanying Town Park), various office blocks, such as the blue office towers (Telford Plaza), and the Windsor Life building. The Forge retail park and a large Odeon Cinema are also located in the area. Telford also houses one of the Midlands' few ice skating rinks near the newly built Telford International Centre (TIC). The TIC comprises a number of hall and event spaces. It holds parties, conferences, concerts and was formerly the venue of the UK Snooker Championship.

A major Shropshire landmark, also now part of Telford, is The Iron Bridge, located in Ironbridge. It was the first bridge of its size in the world made out of cast iron. In the same area is the Ironbridge Gorge, a UNESCO World Heritage Site. The most important landmark in the area is The Wrekin hill. There is also the Lilleshall Monument erected on Lilleshall Hill to the north-east, to the 1st Duke of Sutherland, which has recently been restored.

Education

Telford has a number of primary and secondary schools. These range from academies such as the Telford Langley School to City Technology Colleges like the Thomas Telford School.  to the north are Adams' Grammar School and Newport Girls High School selective schools located in nearby Newport. Wrekin College, an independent co-educational boarding and day school, is located in the Wellington area of Telford.

Further education was handled by Telford College of Arts and Technology (TCAT) and Telford New College, a sixth-form college located in Wellington. In September 2017 the two colleges merged to form Telford College. There are four other sixth forms located at Haberdashers' Abraham Darby, Holy Trinity Academy, Madeley Academy and Thomas Telford School.

Telford is home to The University of Wolverhampton Business School (UWBS) campus and the School of the Built Environment. Harper Adams University, a university specialising in land-based education is located 9.5 miles to the northeast at Edgmond, near Newport.

In 2006 Telford & Wrekin became one of three pilot areas selected as part of the Department for Culture, Media and Sport's Cultural Hubs programme piloting a cultural offer for young people and schools across Telford & Wrekin through the council's Telford Culture Zone programme at the heart of which was effective partnership working and joint planning between the cultural and education sectors.

In July 2012 the Department for Education and Arts Council England selected Telford & Wrekin as one of the new areas for the in Harmony programme working with Old Park Primary School and Children's Centre, Telford & Wrekin Music, City of Birmingham Symphony Orchestra and the Manchester Camerata. In Harmony is a national programme that aims to inspire and transform the lives of children in deprived communities, using the power and disciplines of community-based orchestral music-making.

Transport

Telford is situated at the terminus of the M54 motorway, a spur of the M6 linking the town with Wolverhampton and the West Midlands, and on the A5 road between Shrewsbury and Cannock.

Telford Central railway station is situated on the Shrewsbury to Wolverhampton Line. The town also has Oakengates railway station and Wellington railway station on the same line. All three stations are serviced by trains from Transport for Wales Rail, West Midlands Railway, and Avanti West Coast.

In May 1998, Virgin Trains West Coast introduced a service from Shrewsbury to London Euston. It was withdrawn in 2000. A service to Walsall was introduced from Wellington via Wolverhampton but proved to be unprofitable and was withdrawn by London Midland in December 2008. A new service from Wrexham General to London Marylebone was launched by Wrexham & Shropshire in 2008. The venture however proved unprofitable and ceased to operate on 28 January 2011, leaving Shropshire as the only English county without a direct train link to London. Virgin Trains re-launched a direct Shrewsbury to London Euston service in December 2014. In addition, there are three further stations isolated from the national network, Spring Village, Lawley and Horsehay & Dawley, at Telford Steam Railway, situated at Horsehay.

Telford's rapidly growing population still has a relatively low car ownership. In 2004 Telford & Wrekin council was awarded 'Beacon Status' for improving access to public transport. Being a new town with a planned transport infrastructure, the town features relatively few traffic problems, in comparison to the urban areas of Birmingham or medieval streets of Shrewsbury. The M54 reduces through-traffic on local roads, and the A442 Queensway acts as a north–south artery road.

The majority of bus services in the area are operated by Arriva Midlands from its garage at Stafford Park, which replaced the original Midland Red garage in Wellington. Banga Bus operate service 891 to Wolverhampton via Shifnal and Tettenhall, replacing the original service operated by Midland Red which was latterly operated by Arriva Midlands. Beginning on 1 June 2021, Chaserider launched service X14 to Cannock and the McArthur Glenn West Midlands Designer Outlet. However due to low usage of the service, Chaserider withdrew the X14 in January 2022.

Notable people

Public Service 

 Sir William Forester (1655 - 1718) Whig Politician who accompanied King William III to England at the beginning of the Glorious Revolution. Was born and lived in Wellington.
 Samuel Peploe (1667 - 1752) Bishop of Chester between 1726 and 1752, was baptized in Dawley.
 Sir George Downing, 3rd Baronet (1685 - 1749) Whig politician and founder of Downing College, Cambridge was brought up at Dothill.
 Richard Padmore (1789 - 1881) a British Liberal politician and industrialist born in Wellington.
 Samuel Parkes Cadman (1864 - 1936) an English-born American clergyman, newspaper writer, and pioneer Christian radio broadcaster of the 1920s and 1930s based in New York. Was born in Ketley.
 Major Charles Allix Lavington Yate VC (1872 - 1914) British Army officer and recipient of the Victoria Cross for action in the First World War, was born in Madeley
Sir Joseph Simpson (1909 - 1968) Commissioner of Police of the Metropolis, the head of the London Metropolitan Police, from 1958 to 1968 was born in Dawley.
Len Murray, Baron Murray of Epping Forest OBE, PC (1922 – 2004) a British trade union leader, was born at Hadley.
Jeremy Corbyn (born 1949), Leader of the Labour Party between 2015 and 2020, grew up at Pave Lane and educated at Adams Grammar School, within the borough of Telford & Wrekin, and was active in The Wrekin constituency Young Socialists and the local Labour Party.
 Professor Stephen Molyneux (born 1955) English educational technologist and Mayor of Oakengates between 2003 and 2007, resided in Telford between 1991 and 2018.
David Wright (born 1966), Member of Parliament for Telford between 2001 and 2015. Born in Oakengates.
Kim Hughes (GC) (born 1979) a British Army bomb disposal expert particularly in the Afghanistan conflict, went to Thomas Telford School.

Acting & Writing 

Hesba Stretton (1832 - 1911) an English writer of children's books. Was born in Wellington.
Wyke Bayliss (1835 - 1906) a British poet, author, and painter, was born in Madeley
Edith Pargeter OBE, BEM (1913 in Horsehay – 1995 in Madeley) nom de plume Ellis Peters, was an English author especially of history and historical fiction
 Norman Jones (1932 in Donnington – 2013) an English actor, primarily on TV.
 Stewart Lee (born 1968 in Wellington) an English stand-up comedian, writer and director
 Paul Blackthorne (born 1969 in Wellington) is an English actor, who plays Detective Lance in the DC TV series Arrow
Anna Richardson (born 1970 in Wellington) is an English television presenter, writer and journalist.
 Christian Brassington (born 1983 in Wellington) a film and television actor.
 Jay Swingler (born 1995) a YouTuber.

Sport 

Enoch Tranter (1842 in Old Park – 1910 in Donnington Wood) an English cricketer and coal miner
Matthew Webb (1848 - 1883) the first recorded person to swim the English Channel unaided, was born in Dawley
William Dyas (1872-1940), first-class cricketer as well as local politician and businessman, lived lifelong in Madeley.
William Foulke (1874 - 1916) an English professional football goalkeeper, was born in Dawley.
Joe Butler (1879 in Dawley Bank – 1941) an English professional football goalkeeper who made 457 appearances
Sir Gordon Richards (1904 in Donnington Wood – 1986) won a record 26 champion jockey titles, and was the only flat jockey to be knighted
Ernie Clements (1922 in Hadley – 2006) an English road racing cyclist, frame builder and cycle shop owner
Billy Wright (1924 - 1994) professional English footballer who played for Wolverhampton Wanderers. Became the first football player to earn 100 international caps. Born in Ironbridge. 
Johnny Elliot (1931 - 2015) Jamaican Olympic boxer who lived in Telford. 
John Pender (born 1963) a retired English professional footballer with 496 appearances, mainly for Wolves and Burnley, now lives in Telford.
Mark Elliot (born 1966) Olympic boxer, born in Wellington.
Ted Hankey (born 1968) professional darts player, resides in Telford 
Richie Woodhall (born 1968) former WBC super middleweight champion boxer, grew up in Woodside, Telford. 
Ricky Balshaw (born 1986) is a British para equestrian rider, competed in the Beijing 2008 Paralympics; lives in Telford
Tom Carlon (born 1987 in Telford) an English professional ice hockey player
Josh Crutchley (born 1987) a British professional basketball player, grew up in Telford
 Danny Guthrie (born 1987) professional footballer, attended Thomas Telford School in Telford
 Elliott Bennett (born 1988 in Telford) professional footballer, grew up in Telford, plays for Shrewsbury Town. 
Lee Collins (1988 - 2021) professional footballer, born in Telford. 
 Kyle Bennett (born 1990 in Telford) an English footballer, plays for Bristol Rovers.
 Mickey Bushell MBE (born 1990) is a Paralympic gold medalist, lives in Telford
 Kelly Edwards (born 1990) a British judoka from Telford.
 Connor Goldson (born 1992) professional footballer, attended Thomas Telford School in Telford.
Ryan Giles (born 2000) professional footballer, born in St. Georges.

Music 
Henry Gauntlett (1805 - 1876) an English organist hymnwriter. Was born in Wellington. 
Nigel Rogers (1935 - 2022) an English opera singer, multilingual tenor and music conductor, born in Wellington.
Raymond Froggatt (born 1941) an English songwriter and singer, lives in Telford.
Steve Beresford (born 1950) an English musician, born in Wellington.
 Stephen Jones (born 1962) an English musician and novelist who fronted Indie Band Babybird
 T'Pau (formed 1986) a British pop group whose members are from Telford (Wellington) and Shrewsbury. 
 Cancer (formed in 1988) a death metal band from Ironbridge.
 The Sunshine Underground (years active 2000–2016) an alternative dance band, originally from Telford and Shrewsbury, formed while studying at New College Telford.
 David Brown (born 1987) is a British YouTuber and musician.

Science 

 William Withering (1741 - 1799) an English botanist, geologist, chemist, physician, first systematic investigator of the bioactivity of digitalis, and member of the Lunar Society, was born in Wellington.
Thomas Campbell Eyton (1809 - 1880) English naturalist and friend of Charles Darwin. Was born in Eyton Hall near Wellington.
Dr Jacob Noel-Storr (born 1976) English astrophysics scientist. Born in Telford.

Miscellaneous 

 William Ball (1795 - 1852) an iron puddler believed to be the heaviest man in England while he was alive. Weighing approximately 40 stone, Ball was exhibited around the country at county fairs as the "largest man in Britain". He was born in Horsehay.

Sport
Telford is home to a variety of established amateur, semi-pro and professional sports clubs.

The town was represented by Telford United F.C. between 1969 and 2004. Following financial difficulties, the club folded in 2004 and was reformed in the same year as AFC Telford United.
Between 2004 and 2020, AFC Telford United's home ground, the New Bucks Head, was used as the venue for home matches played by the under-23 team of Wolverhampton Wanderers F.C.
AFC Telford United have won the Shropshire Senior Cup on three occasions in 2009, 2014, and 2017. They won promotion to Conference North in 2007, beating Witton Albion 3–1 in the play-offs. In 2009 they won the Setanta Shield Trophy, beating Forest Green Rovers 3-0 on penalties.
AFC Telford United currently play in the National League North having been relegated from the Conference Premier at the end of the 2014–15 season.
Telford has a Supporters Club following Wolverhampton Wanderers F.C., organising travel to away games and hosting social functions.

Ice hockey in the town is represented by the Telford Tigers, an English Premier Ice Hockey League (EPL or EPIHL) team originally formed in 1985. Telford Titans, an ENL Team, had represented development hockey in the town from 2008 however it folded in 2014.

Ice racing first came to the Telford Ice skating Rink in February 1986 with the Skoal Bandits Trophy being won by Hans Nielsen. In November of the same year Jan andersson won the Ice International trophy and retained the trophy at the next event in 1988. In 1989 The British Open Championship was held and continued every year until 2008. The competition returned in 2011 and 2012. After this time ice racing at Telford discontinued. 

American football teams in the town include Shropshire Revolution, Wrekin Giants (1985–1989), Shropshire Giants (1989), and Cannock Chase Giants (1989-1993/4).

Telford Raiders are the town's Rugby League club, although there have been other Rugby League Clubs in Telford historically, such as the Telford All Blacks and Shropshire Scorpions.Telford Hornets represent the town at Rugby Union.

Shropshire Warriors Basketball Club play at Telford College of Art and Technology (TCAT).

The Telford International Centre hosted the UK Snooker Championship from 2007 to 2010. The championship moved from York in 2007 but returned to the refurbished Barbican Centre in York since 2011.

Telford is home to four golf courses. The Shropshire Golf Centre is located near Muxton, in the northeast of Telford. Other courses in Telford include Horsehay Village Golf Club, in Horsehay, The Wrekin Golf Club, in Wellington, and Telford Golf and Country Club, in Madeley.

There are a number of cricket clubs within Telford competing in local leagues. Both Wellington Cricket Club and Madeley Cricket Club currently play in the Premier Division of the Shropshire County Cricket League whilst St. George's Cricket Club play in Division One of the Shropshire County Cricket League. Shropshire County Cricket Club often play at Orleton Park in Wellington and St George's Cricket Ground in St. George's.

References

External links

Official Tourism Website for Ironbridge & Telford

 
Telford and Wrekin
Towns in Shropshire
New towns in England
Populated places established in 1968
New towns started in the 1960s